Gary David Bowyer (born 22 June 1971) is an English professional football coach and former player who is the manager of Scottish club Dundee.

As a player, he made 52 league appearances for Hereford United, Nottingham Forest and Rotherham United in a professional career that lasted eight years, before retiring due to injury in 1997, aged 25. He won the Football League Trophy with Rotherham United in 1995–96, his only honour as a player.

After working as a coach at a number of clubs, he has managed Blackburn Rovers, Blackpool, Bradford City and Salford City (twice). He guided Blackpool to promotion, via the play-offs, from League Two to League One in 2016–17.

Early and personal life
Bowyer was born on 22 June 1971 in Manchester, Lancashire, England. His father, Ian, was also a professional footballer; the two played together at Hereford United.

Playing career
After playing in non-League football for Westfields, Bowyer, a full-back, signed for Football League team Hereford United on non-contract terms, making 14 appearances in the 1989–90 season. After the season ended, Bowyer moved to Nottingham Forest, but he did not make a senior Football League appearance for club. Bowyer later signed for Rotherham United, making 38 appearances in the League over the next two seasons, before retiring due to injury at the age of 25. Whilst at Rotherham he was a part of the team that won the 1996 Football League Trophy Final.

Coaching career

Youth coach and move into management
After retiring as a player, Bowyer began his coaching career working part-time at Ilkeston, before being appointed as under-17s coach at Derby County, where he spent six years as an academy coach. He then became under-18s coach for Blackburn Rovers in 2004. He became their reserve-team manager in 2008, and in December 2012 he was appointed as caretaker manager following the dismissal of Henning Berg, steering them to a 3–1 victory over Barnsley in his first game in charge. It was later announced that Bowyer would remain in charge until the end of January. Bowyer was re-appointed caretaker manager on 19 March 2013, following the sacking of Michael Appleton, until the end of the season; however, on 26 March Bowyer said he was unsure how long he would remain in the position, in case the club hired a new permanent manager, and on 8 April Bowyer was summoned to India for a meeting with the club's owners. Bowyer was appointed the permanent manager of Blackburn on 24 May, on a 12-month rolling contract.

In September 2015, he called for goal-line technology to be implemented. On 10 November, Bowyer was sacked as manager of Blackburn Rovers.

Blackpool and Bradford City spells
On 1 June 2016, Bowyer was appointed as manager of Blackpool on a one-year rolling contract, following the club's relegation to EFL League Two. On 28 May 2017, Bowyer guided Blackpool to an immediate return to EFL League One in his first season in charge after his side beat Exeter City 2–1 in the League Two play-off final. He resigned as Blackpool manager on 6 August 2018.

In February 2019 he was linked with the vacant managerial position at Bradford City. On 4 March, Bowyer replaced David Hopkin as Bantams manager, signing a contract until the end of the season, with Andy Todd as his assistant. Bowyer retained the club's other coaching staff—including Martin Drury, who had been caretaker manager prior to his appointment— and said that all of City's squad players would have a chance to fight for a first-team place. In April, he signed a new contract with Bradford City until 2021. He was nominated for the League Two Manager of the Month award for October, but later said he was not a "fan" of such awards. Bowyer was sacked by Bradford City on 3 February 2020.

Derby County youth and Salford City
He joined Derby County, as coach of their under-23s side, in September 2020. On 23 March 2021, it was announced that Bowyer was to become manager of League Two side Salford City on a deal lasting until the end of the season, replacing Richie Wellens. The deal came after an arrangement was reached between Salford co-owner Gary Neville and Derby manager Wayne Rooney, whereby Salford would pay no fee to Derby but would pay his wages for the duration of his spell in charge. He described the move to Salford as the first ever managerial loan. His first game in charge was on 27 March, a 1–0 away defeat to Exeter City, and picked up his first win on 5 April, two Ian Henderson goals giving Salford a 2–0 win against Forest Green Rovers. After achieving 17 points from eight matches to help boost his side's play-off aspirations, Bowyer was awarded the League Two Manager of the Month award for April. On 10 May he returned to his role as an academy coach at Derby County; however, two days later on 12 May, it was announced that he had returned to manage Salford City after signing a two-year contract. On 2 August, Billy Barr joined as his assistant manager.

On 21 August 2021, he was booked for shoving Jonny Williams of Swindon Town in a 1–0 defeat, Salford's fourth game without a win at the beginning of the season, the club's worst start to a season since the 2014 takeover.

On 17 May 2022, Bowyer was sacked by Salford having narrowly missed out on the play-offs.

Dundee 
On 8 June 2022, Bowyer was appointed manager of Scottish Championship club Dundee. The Dundee board said they liked his youth strategy and success at Blackpool. Bowyer was named the Scottish Championship's Manager of the Month for November 2022, with his team having won every game that month.

Managerial statistics

Honours

Player
Rotherham United
Football League Trophy: 1995–96

Manager

Club 
Blackpool
EFL League Two play-offs: 2017

Individual 
Blackpool
EFL League Two Manager of the Month: April 2021
Dundee

 Scottish Championship Manager of the Month: November 2022

References

External links

1971 births
Living people
Footballers from Manchester
English footballers
Association football fullbacks
Westfields F.C. players
Hereford United F.C. players
Nottingham Forest F.C. players
Rotherham United F.C. players
English Football League players
English football managers
Blackburn Rovers F.C. managers
Blackpool F.C. managers
Bradford City A.F.C. managers
Derby County F.C. non-playing staff
Blackburn Rovers F.C. non-playing staff
Salford City F.C. managers
Dundee F.C. managers
English Football League managers
Scottish Professional Football League managers